Al-Mahawil also Mahawil, Al Maḩāwīl, Qaḑā’ al Maḩāwīl, and Khān al Mahawīl) is one of a very few Sunni Arab towns in southern Iraq in the Babil Governorate. Before the invasion of Iraq, Sunnis made up the vast majority. Today, they are a shrinking minority of the population due to the influx of Shias from the surrounding countryside. Its population was 31,200 in 2018.

References

Mahawil
Mahawil